The following is a complete list of all US Routes that run through the state of New Jersey.

Mainline routes

Special routes

See also

State highways in New Jersey
List of Interstate Highways in New Jersey
List of state highways in New Jersey
Former numbered routes in New Jersey
Proposed highways in New Jersey
County routes in New Jersey

References

External links

New Jersey Department of Transportation
Unofficial New Jersey route log

U.S.